The 1977 Missouri Tigers football team was an American football team that represented the University of Missouri in the Big Eight Conference (Big 8) during the 1977 NCAA Division I football season. The team compiled a 4–7 record (3–4 against Big 8 opponents), finished in fifth place in the Big 8, and was outscored by opponents by a combined total of 195 to 180. Al Onofrio was the head coach for the sixth of seven seasons. The team played its home games at Faurot Field in Columbia, Missouri.

The team's statistical leaders included Earl Gant with 769 rushing yards, Pete Woods with 785 passing yards, Phil Bradley with 864 yards of total offense, Joe Stewart with 384 receiving yards, and Jeff Brockhaus with 49 points scored.

Schedule

Roster

References

Missouri
Missouri Tigers football seasons
Missouri Tigers football